The 1985 Central and Western District Board election was held on 7 March 1985 to elect all 13 elected to the 19-member Central and Western District Board. The 5 incumbents formed a coalition with 7 other candidates and swept the polls with winning 10 out of the 12 seats.

Overall election results

Results by constituency

Chung Wan

Kennedy Town East

Kennedy Town West and Mount Davis

Middle Levels and Peak

Sai Ying Pun East

Sai Ying Pun West

Sheung Wan

References

1985 Hong Kong local elections
Central and Western District Council elections